Sportsmanlike conduct (or rarely, sportspersonlike conduct, may refer to:

 Broadly, comporting oneself with sportsmanship, the sporting ethos.
 Narrowly, avoiding violation of unsportsmanlike conduct rules in a sport.